The  Hawaii lunar sample displays  are two commemorative plaques consisting of small fragments of Moon specimen brought back with the Apollo 11 and Apollo 17 lunar missions and given in the 1970s to the people of the state of Hawaii by United States President Richard Nixon as goodwill gifts.

Description

Apollo 11

Apollo 17

History 
Joseph Gutheinz, a former NASA employee and self-appointed private investigator of the Apollo lunar sample displays, reported in 2009 that he did know where Hawaii's Apollo 11 or Apollo 17 "goodwill Moon rocks" plaque displays were. The displays had been stored in a locked cabinet in the governor's office and were located during an inventory in 2010, according to a spokesperson for the governor. The governor's office records showed they had secured both displays, but their exact location was unclear. A senior adviser for the governor's office said they knew all along they were there someplace. The displays were not on exhibit as of 2010.

See also
 List of Apollo lunar sample displays

References

Further reading 

 

Stolen and missing moon rocks
Tourist attractions in Hawaii